Ishii ("stone well") is a Japanese surname. Notable people with the surname include:

Akio Ishii (born 1955), Japanese baseball player
Ami Ishii (born 1980), Japanese gravure idol
Anna Ishii (born 1998), Japanese performer, model and actress
David Ishii (born 1955), Japanese-American golfer
Erika Ishii, Voice actor 
Hiroshi Ishii (computer scientist), professor at the Massachusetts Institute of Technology
Hiroshi Ishii (golfer) (born 1941), Japanese golfer
, Japanese manga artist
Hitoshi Ishii (born 1947), Japanese mathematician
, Japanese footballer
Kan Ishii (1921–2009), Japanese composer, and the brother of composer Maki Ishii
Katsuhito Ishii (born 1966), Japanese film director
Kazuhisa Ishii (born 1973), Japanese baseball player
Kazuyoshi Ishii (born 1953), Japanese karateka
Ken Ishii, Japanese DJ and music producer
Kentarō Ishii, Japanese shogi player
Kikujiro Ishii (1866–1945), Japanese diplomat who negotiated the Lansing-Ishii Agreement
, Japanese swimmer
Koichi Ishii, Japanese video game director
Koki Ishii (born 1995), Japanese footballer
Kouji Ishii (born 1960), Japanese voice actor (real name Kōzō Ishii)
Kunio Ishii (born 1941), professional Go player
Maki Ishii (1936–2003), Japanese composer, and the brother of composer Kan Ishii
Mario Alberto Ishii (born 1951), Argentine politician
, Japanese actor, comedian and narrator
Satoshi Ishii (born 1986), Japanese judoka and mixed martial arts fighter
Shigemi Ishii (born 1951), Japanese footballer
Shirō Ishii (1892–1959), military physician who created and ran Japan's biological warfare program
, Japanese sport wrestler
Sogo Ishii (born 1957), Japanese film director
Susumu Ishii (1924–1991), second kaicho (Godfather) of the Inagawa-kai yakuza gang in Japan
Takashi Ishii (film director) (born 1946), Japanese film director and screenwriter
Takashi Ishii (baseball) (born 1971), Japanese baseball pitcher and coach
Takeo Ishii (born May 3, 1947), Japanese yodeler
Takuro Ishii (born 1970), Japanese baseball player
Tatsuya Ishii (born 1959), Japanese singer, songwriter, artist, and industrial designer
Teruo Ishii (1924–2005), Japanese film director
Tomiko Ishii (born 1935), Japanese actress
Tomohiro Ishii (born 1975), Japanese professional wrestler
, Japanese golfer
, Japanese alpine skier
Vania Ishii (born 1973), Japanese-Brazilian judoka
Yasushi Ishii (born 1970), Japanese singer and composer
, Japanese historian
, Japanese writer 
Yuki Ishii (born 1991), volleyball player
Yutaka Ishii (1920–?), Japanese baseball player

Fictional characters
O-Ren Ishii, a fictional character and the main antagonist from the Quentin Tarantino film, Kill Bill: Volume 1

Japanese-language surnames